Sepp Schneider (born 3 June 1991) is an Austrian Nordic combined skier. He competed in the World Cup 2015 season.

He represented Austria at the FIS Nordic World Ski Championships 2015 in Falun.

References

External links 
 

1991 births
Living people
Austrian male Nordic combined skiers